Mark Byron Nixon is a New Zealand former rugby league footballer who played in the 1980s and 1990s.

Playing career
Nixon played for the Hornby club in the Canterbury Rugby League competition and represented Canterbury. In 1989 he spent ten weeks in Australia with the Canberra Raiders as part of the New Zealand Rugby League's "Rookie Scheme".

In 1990 he was selected for the New Zealand national rugby league team and played in two Test matches against Papua New Guinea. Later that year he moved to England, joining the Rochdale Hornets for the 1990/91 season.

In 1993 Nixon captained Canterbury and was selected as a Kiwi triallist. From there he was selected as part of the Kiwis touring side to Great Britain and France but did not play in any Test matches.

In 1994 Nixon was part of the Canterbury Country Cardinals in the new Lion Red Cup. At the end of the year he again moved to England, playing for the Featherstone Rovers during the 1994/95 season.

Nixon again represented Canterbury in 1997. He played for Hornby.

Later years
Nixon is a long-standing current employee of the Aviation security services of New Zealand, based at Christchurch International Airport.

Previous to this between his stints overseas playing Rugby League, Nixon had a long association with NZ Post.

References

Living people
New Zealand rugby league players
New Zealand national rugby league team players
1968 births
Canterbury rugby league team players
Featherstone Rovers players
Rochdale Hornets players
New Zealand rugby league commentators
Hornby Panthers players
Junior Kiwis players
Rugby league five-eighths